Spilarctia brunnea is a moth in the family Erebidae. It was described by Franciscus J. M. Heylaerts in 1890. It is found on Sumatra.

References

Moths described in 1890
brunnea